John William Poff (born October 23, 1952) is an American former professional baseball outfielder.

A native of Chillicothe, Ohio, Poff attended Findlay High School, and went on to play college baseball at Duke University, graduating in 1974. In 1972 and 1973, he played collegiate summer baseball with the Wareham Gatemen of the Cape Cod Baseball League. He was signed by the Philadelphia Phillies as an amateur free agent in 1974.

References

External links 

 SABR Biography

1952 births
Living people
American expatriate baseball players in Canada
Baseball players from Ohio
Duke Blue Devils baseball players
Edmonton Trappers players
Major League Baseball outfielders
Milwaukee Brewers players
Oklahoma City 89ers players
Omaha Royals players
People from Oscoda County, Michigan
Philadelphia Phillies players
Pulaski Phillies players
Rocky Mount Phillies players
Reading Phillies players
Wareham Gatemen players
Findlay High School alumni